Isaiah Roby (born February 3, 1998) is an American professional basketball player who last played for the San Antonio Spurs of the National Basketball Association (NBA). He played college basketball for the Nebraska Cornhuskers.

High school career
Roby attended Dixon High School in Dixon, Illinois. He joined a team that finished its previous season with a 1–28 record, but in his final three years at Dixon, he led the team to a combined 76–13 record. In his junior season, Roby averaged 12.5 points, 9.8 rebounds, 2.6 steals and 3.7 blocks per game, earning second-team all-state Class 3A honors. As a senior, he averaged 19.7 points, 10.5 rebounds, 5.5 assists and 3.9 blocks per game. Roby finished eighth in Illinois Mr. Basketball voting and was named second-team all-state by the Chicago Sun-Times. He left Dixon with the most career rebounds and blocks in school history and the second-most career points. Roby was rated a three-star recruit by ESPN and 247Sports, and a four-star recruit by Rivals. On October 22, 2014, he committed to Nebraska.

College career
Roby entered his freshman season for Nebraska in 2016–17 with a pelvic stress reaction suffered in the offseason, delaying his college debut. He remarked, "It's probably the longest I sat out from basketball since I started playing basketball." In 30 games, Roby made four starts and averaged 3.1 points and 2.9 rebounds per game, while recording 25 blocks, the fifth-most by a Nebraska freshman. As a sophomore, Roby averaged 8.7 points and team-highs of 6.3 rebounds and two blocks per game. He also led his team in field goal percentage, shooting 57 percent, and compiled 63 blocks, the most by a Nebraska player since 2001. In his junior season, Roby started in all 35 games, averaging 11.8 points, 6.9 rebounds, and 1.9 blocks per game. He led Nebraska to an unexpected run in the 2019 Big Ten tournament.

On March 30, 2019, Roby declared for the 2019 NBA draft without hiring an agent.

Professional career

Texas Legends (2019–2020)
Roby was drafted 45th by the Detroit Pistons and traded to the Dallas Mavericks. On August 7, 2019, Roby officially signed with the Mavericks. The Mavericks assigned him to the Texas Legends for the start of the NBA G League season. He suffered from plantar fasciitis, which caused him to miss several games for the Legends.

Oklahoma City Thunder (2020–2022)
On January 24, 2020, Roby was traded to the Oklahoma City Thunder by the Mavericks in exchange for Justin Patton and cash considerations. He did not appear in a game during his time with the Mavericks. He made his NBA debut with a brief appearance for the Thunder in January 2020. He was then assigned shortly thereafter to the Oklahoma City Blue, returning to the main Thunder roster for only a single day before being sent back to the Blue.

On December 29, 2020, Roby scored a season-high 19 points, alongside seven rebounds and two blocks, in a 107–118 loss to the Orlando Magic.

On March 28, 2022, Roby scored a career-high 30 points, alongside eight rebounds, four assists and two steals, in a 134–131 win over the Portland Trail Blazers. On July 3, Roby was waived by the Thunder.

San Antonio Spurs (2022–2023)
On July 5, 2022, Roby was claimed off waivers by the San Antonio Spurs. He made his Spurs debut on October 19, recording five points and two rebounds in a 102–129 loss to the Charlotte Hornets. On March 3, 2023, Roby was waived by the Spurs.

Career statistics

NBA

|-
| style="text-align:left;"| 
| style="text-align:left;"| Oklahoma City
| 3 || 0 || 3.7 || .000 || — || — || .7 || .0 || .0 || .0 || .0
|-
| style="text-align:left;"| 
| style="text-align:left;"| Oklahoma City
| 61 || 34 || 23.4 || .483 || .294 || .744 || 5.6 || 1.8 || .9 || .6 || 8.7
|-
| style="text-align:left;"| 
| style="text-align:left;"| Oklahoma City
| 45 || 28 || 21.1 || .514 || .444 || .672 || 4.8 || 1.6 || .8 || .8 || 10.1
|-
| style="text-align:left;"| 
| style="text-align:left;"| San Antonio
| 42 || 2 || 11.3 || .432 || .300 || .488 || 2.5 || .9 || .4 || .2 || 4.1
|- class="sortbottom"
| style="text-align:center;" colspan="2"| Career
| 151 || 64 || 18.9 || .485 || .351 || .675 || 4.4 || 1.4 || .7 || .5 || 7.7

College

|-
| style="text-align:left;"| 2016–17
| style="text-align:left;"| Nebraska
| 30 || 4 || 15.2 || .394 || .200 || .762 || 2.9 || .7 || .5 || .8 || 3.1
|-
| style="text-align:left;"| 2017–18
| style="text-align:left;"| Nebraska
| 32 || 13 || 24.0 || .565 || .405 || .724 || 6.3 || 1.7 || .6 || 2.0 || 8.7
|-
| style="text-align:left;"| 2018–19
| style="text-align:left;"| Nebraska
| 35 || 35 || 31.2 || .454 || .333 || .677 || 6.9 || 1.9 || 1.3 || 1.9 || 11.8
|- class="sortbottom"
| style="text-align:center;" colspan="2"| Career
| 97 || 52 || 23.9 || .476 || .336 || .702 || 5.5 || 1.5 || .8 || 1.6 || 8.1

References

External links
Nebraska Cornhuskers bio

1998 births
Living people
American men's basketball players
Basketball players from Illinois
Detroit Pistons draft picks
Nebraska Cornhuskers men's basketball players
Oklahoma City Blue players
Oklahoma City Thunder players
People from Dixon, Illinois
Power forwards (basketball)
San Antonio Spurs players
Texas Legends players